Weyns's duiker (Cephalophus weynsi) is a tiny antelope found in the Democratic Republic of Congo, Uganda and western Kenya. It is sometimes spelled "Weyn's", "Weyns", or "Weyns duiker.

Weyns's duikers average about 33 lb (15 kg) in weight when full grown, with a shoulder height of about 17 in (43 cm). They have plain rufous coats.

This duiker makes it home in lowlands and montane rainforests.

References

 
Wild-about-you.com

Weyns's duiker
Mammals of the Democratic Republic of the Congo
Mammals of Kenya
Mammals of Uganda
Weyns's duiker
Weyns's duiker